This list consists of Hong Kong, Macau and Taiwanese players in Chinese football leagues.

Policies 
Policy for Hong Kong, Macau and Taiwanese players has changed continually. Players from Hong Kong Football Association were considered foreigners at the beginning of 2009, but the league held back the change until the summer transfer window. After the 2010 season, players from Macau Football Association and Chinese Taipei Football Association (except goalkeepers) were not considered foreigners in CSL matches, but will be regarded as foreigners in AFC competitions. In the 2015 season, players who had not played for the Hong Kong national football team, Macau national football team or the Chinese Taipei national football team were no longer deemed native players. In the 2016 and 2017 season, players from the three associations whose contract was signed after 1 January 2016 were no longer deemed native players. From the 2018 season, a club could register one non-naturalized player from the three associations as a native player. According to the Chinese FA, a non-naturalized player refers to someone who was first registered as a professional footballer in the three football associations. Furthermore, Hong Kong or Macau players must be of Chinese descent of Hong Kong or Macau permanent resident, and Taiwanese players must be citizens of Taiwan.

List of players

Hong Kong

Taiwan (Chinese Taipei)

Macau 

As of now, no Macanese player has joined any mainland team in the Chinese football leagues. However, in 2018, a Macanese football team which is called MFA Development participated in the 2018 Chinese Champions League though by league rules, they were not permitted to gain promotion.

References 

Football in China